Oxythemis phoenicosceles, the Pepperpants, is a species of dragonfly in the family Libellulidae. It is found in Benin, Cameroon, the Republic of the Congo, the Democratic Republic of the Congo, Ivory Coast, Gabon, Gambia, Ghana, Liberia, Nigeria, and Uganda. Its natural habitats are subtropical or tropical moist lowland forests, shrub-dominated wetlands, and freshwater marshes.

It is the only species in its genus.

References

Libellulidae
Taxa named by Friedrich Ris
Insects described in 1910
Taxonomy articles created by Polbot